Dietmar H. Wittmann, M.D., Ph.D., FACS (born June 16, 1940)  is an academic surgeon specializing in complex abdominal surgery.  He was associated with the following medical schools: University of Hamburg, Germany, University of Düsseldorf, Germany,  University of California San Francisco Medical School,USA, Hahnemann Medical School, Philadelphia,USA, Medical College of Wisconsin Milwaukee, USA . In addition to his clinical work, research, publications and teaching and lecturing worldwide, he is mostly known for his work relating to intra-abdominal infections, abdominal compartment syndrome abdominal compartment syndrome and staged abdominal repair STAR. Besides introducing  the concept of calculated antimicrobial therapy Wittmann conceptualized the operative strategy of Staged Abdominal Repair (STAR) or the planned open abdomen to reverse the detrimental effects of the abdominal compartment syndrome and to treat imminent intra abdominal complications before they progress to life-threatening conditions. He is the inventor of a fascia prosthesis for temporary abdominal closure, the Artificial Bur Fascia Prosthesis (generic) or Wittmann Patch and Star Patch (trade names).

Biography
Wittmann was born on June 16, 1940, in Duisburg, Germany, and educated in France and Germany before starting medical school in Hamburg, Germany.  He studied Medicine at the medical schools of Hamburg, Düsseldorf, and the University of California San Francisco Medical School. He graduated summa cum laude from the University of Hamburg. Two years later Wittmann defended a Ph.D. thesis in Neurophysiology/Toxicology at the University of Düsseldorf on the affinity of carbon monoxide to hemoglobin of various laboratory animals and men.

Following medical school he continued his surgical training in Hamburg, Philadelphia, Annaba, Algeria, to become Board certified General Surgeon and after an additional two years, a Board certified  (surgeon for soft tissue, visceral and orthopedic trauma).In 1988, after organizing an International Congress in Hamburg, Germany, with the sole topic of intra-abdominal infection and founding the Surgical Infection Society - Europe, he accepted a position as professor of surgery at the Medical College of Wisconsin.

Professional work
He worked first at the Altona General Hospital of the University of Hamburg Medical School. His early research was focused on peptic ulcer disease, and highly selective vagotomy and he developed a method to measure gastrin levels in antral vein blood long before sophisticated analysis methods to measure pg levels were established.

Concerning antimicrobial therapy of surgical infection, he started measuring antibiotic concentrations in tissue fluid representative for the site of infection by analyzing body fluids and bone chips and that would have been disposed of in the course of surgical procedures. Antibiotic concentrations measured in tissues were then be compared to concentrations required to kill bacteria to serve as the foundation of anti-infective therapies. Based on these studies Wittmann habilitated for professor of surgery at the University of Hamburg defending his thesis about the concentration dynamics of antimicrobials intra-abdominal infections.
In 1972 Wittmann had the opportunity to work in Annaba, Algeria, and took his young family to Algeria for an anticipated two-year commitment. After a year political unrest forced the Wittmanns to return to Germany but by then he had seen many diseases in their advanced stages including abdominal infections. 
The culmination of experiences led Wittmann to begin to develop a means to keep the abdominal wall safely open for serial intra-operative treatment and control of healing processes. Early attempts used a variety of temporary closure devices such as retention sutures, zippers, and slide fasteners. Ultimately he discovered the method of hook and loop fasteners to be optimal for closing the abdomen temporarily. In 1988 he joined the faculty of Robert E. Condon and Charles Aprahamian at the Medical College of Wisconsin and became a full professor of surgery. He developed one of the first US  surgical critical care fellowship programs at the Medical College of Wisconsin in 1990 and became its first director. In 2000 Wittmann retired from the medical college but continued his work on the staged abdominal repair and the hook and loop fastener temporary fascia prosthesis. He remained active providing advice to surgeons worldwide using his website www.openabdomen.org and continued to lecture about the fundamental benefits of the planned open abdomen.

Inventions
 1976: Measurement of pre-hepatic gastrin concentrations by antral vein puncture.
 1977: First-time investigation of antibiotic concentrations in body fluids of patients as a basis to guide antimicrobial therapy and monitor penetration of antibiotics to the site of infection.
 1979: Invention of the "Kuh von Altona, a suctioning device to collect otherwise not used body fluids from patients for pharmacokinetic investigations and to collect pro-inflammatory and inflammatory mediators and proteins.
 1980: Pharmacodynamics: Antimicrobial concentrations at the site of infection as the foundation of therapy.
 1981: First-time differentiation of various bone compartments to identify the bone compartment that is relevant for infection and where antibiotics should concentrate.
 1982: First-time investigation of the relevance of protein binding in humans by synchronous application and measurements of two penicillins with the same half-life but different degrees of protein binding.  Measurements were performed in serum and in peritoneal fluid.
 1983: First-time investigation to measure inflammatory proteins in peritoneal fluid.
 1983: Peritonitis Index Altona PIA-I (Scoring system for intra-abdominal infections).
 1987: Peritonitis Index Altona PIA-II (Scoring system for intra-abdominal infections).
 1983: Calculated Antimicrobial Therapy for mixed Surgical Infections.
 1987: Foundation of the Surgical Infection Society - Europe.
 1987: The Artificial Bur Fascia Prosthesis, a temporary abdominal closure device that facilitates planned relaparotomies or Staged Abdominal Repairs (STAR or Stage Injury Repair (STIR).
 1991: STAR (Staged Abdominal Repair), a new operative approach for intra-abdominal infections utilizing the hook and loop fastener fascia prosthesis.
 1993: STIR (Staged Injury Repair), a new operative approach for severe trauma utilizing the hook and loop fastener fascia prosthesis.
 1994: Quality of life after trauma as an outcome criterion to measure the quality of trauma care.
 1995: Discovery of Fox Den Disease as a separate surgical infection.
 1995: Dynamic Antibiotic Switching Therapy (DAST), a new form of antibiotic treatment: changing the antibiotic regimen every 24 hours to avoid selection of resistant bacterial strains.

PATENTS

212 A burr-like device to facilitate temporary abdominal closure in planned multiple laparotomies. by Dietmar H. Wittmann, Charles Aprahamian, Jack M. Bergstein, Charles E. Edmiston.
Eur J Surg 159: 75-79, 1993

414 Staged abdominal repair: Development and current practice of an advanced operative technique for diffuse suppurative peritonitis by Dietmar H. Wittmann.
European Surgery 32(4):171-178 (DOI: 10.1007/BF02949258)

Patent No.7,658,749 Method Wittmann Hypopack 2010-02-09
 
Patent No.7,662,169 Methd Temp Fascia Prosthesis (Wittmann Patch)2010-02-16

Patent No.8,128,655 Apparatus Wittmann-Hypopack-2012-03-06
 
Patent No.8,469,996 Apparatus Temp Fascia Prosthesis-(Wittmann Patch)2013-06-25

References 

 Adler E, Wittmann DH. Acute hemorrhage of gastroduodenal ulcer managed without adequate blood transfusions. Zbl Chir 100:598-602, 1975.
 Wittmann DH, Schröder HJ. Diagnostic and therapeutic problems with gallstone ileus. Act Chir 11:247-602, 1976.
 Wittmann DH, Eggert A. A new method to obtain high concentrations of gastrin for quantitative analysis of different human gastrin fractions. Chirurg 48:159-160, 1977.
 Wittmann DH, Eggert A. Pathogenesis of gallstone ileus.  Chirurg 48:678-680, 1977.
 Wittmann DH, Eckardt K, Randel G. The risk of cancer in papillomatous disease of the breast. Verhandlungen Deutsche Krebs Gesellschaft 2:64-65, 1979.
 Wittmann DH. Chemotherapeutic principles in difficult-to-treat infections in surgery. I. Peritonitis. Infection 8:323-329, 1980.
 Wittmann DH. Chemotherapeutic principles in difficult-to-treat infections in surgery. II. Bone and joint infections. Infection 8:330-333, 1980.
 Wittmann DH, Kirschner H. Educational recommendations regarding the intern year based on the practical experience in the two surgical departments at Altona General Hospital. Hamburger Ärzteblatt 3:181-184, 1980.
 Wittmann DH, Schassan H-H, Freitag V. Correlation of pharmacokinetic-bacteriological findings with clinical results of antimicrobial therapy for peritonitis.   In B Wiedemann (Ed): Die Resistenz gegenüber Beta-lactam-Antibiotika. Bad Honnef, Germany, pp. 242–249, 1980.
 Wittmann DH, Schassan H-H. Influence of protein binding on tissue penetration of Isooxaloyl-and Alcylureido-Penicillins. Current Chemother Immunotherapy, American Society for Microbiology Washington DC, 1981, pp. 653.
 Wittmann DH, Schassan H-H. Bone concentrations of six new beta-lactam-antibiotics. Current Chemother Immunother, American Society for Microbiology Washington DC, 1981, pp. 628–629.
 Wittmann DH. Suitable preoperative precautions to reduce the risk of post-operative infection following abdominal procedures. Umweltmedizin 3:38-40, 1981.
 Wittmann DH, Schassan H-H. Basics for antimicrobial therapy of peritonitis. Langenbecks Arch Chir 358:589-590, 1982.
 Eggert A, Teichmann W, Wittmann DH. Pathological implication of duodenal diverticula. Surg Gynecol Obstet (now J American College of Surgeons) 154:62-64, 1982.
 Wittmann DH, Kellinghusen C, Welter J, Freitag V. Intra-abdominal infections: results of a prospective randomized trial. Act Chir 18:229-353, 1983.
 Wittmann DH, Schassan H-H. Penetration of eight beta-lactam antibiotics into peritoneal fluid. Arch Surg 118:205-212, 1983.
 Wittmann DH, Berghoff D, Reynders-Frederix V, Schassan H-H. Significance of hydroxyl apatite with regard to determination of antimicrobial bone concentrations.  Arzneim Forsch/Drug Res 33:423-426, 1983.
 Winker H, Dörtemann J, Wittmann DH. Prophylaxis of infections after elective colon surgery. Result of a prospective controlled double blinded study.   Chirurg 54:272-277, 1983.
 Wittmann DH, Kirschner H, Luetkens S. Long term results of elective and urgent highly selective vagotomy.   Langenbecks Arch Chir 361:(243)671-672, 1983.
 Jeckstadt P, Wittmann DH. A prognostic index for intra-abdominal infections.  Fortschr Antimicrob Antineoplast Chemother 2:517-525, 1983.
 Wittmann DH. Development and goals of the Study Group Peritonitis.   Fortschr Antimicrob Antineoplast Chemother 2:311-317, 1983.
 Wittmann DH. Bacteriological findings in different forms of peritonitis.    Fortschr Antimicrob Antineoplast Chemother 2:423-429, 1983.
 Wittmann DH. Clinical use and pharmacokinetics of metronidazole.  Fortschr Antimicrob Antineoplast Chemother 2:757-782, 1983.
 Teichmann W, Eggert A, Wittmann DH, Böcker W. The zipper: new method for temporary abdominal closure.   Chirurg 56:173-178, 1985.
 Wittmann DH, Teichmann W, Frommelt L. Importance of pathogenic bacteria with regard to therapy of suppurative peritonitis.   Chirurg 56:363-370, 1985.
 Wittmann DH, Teichmann W. Etappenlavage and treatment of pathogenic bacteria.   Langenbecks Arch Chir 366:629-630, 1985.
 Wittmann DH. Calculated antibiotic therapy of infections following abdominal trauma. Infections in Surgery, 4:S21-23, 1985.
 Wittmann DH. Antibiotic concentration in tissue fluid during the vulnerable period as rational basis for prophylaxis of post-operative infections: Focus on infections after operations of the colon biliary tree and bone. In J Ishigami (Ed), Recent Advances in Chemotherapy, University of Tokyo Press, pp. 189–192, 1985.
 Teichmann W, Wittmann DH, Andreone PA. Scheduled reoperations (Etappenlavage) for diffuse peritonitis. Arch Surg 121:147-152, 1986.
 Wittmann DH, Kotthaus E. Further methodological improvements in antibiotic bone concentration measurements: penetration of ofloxacin into bone and cartilage. Infection 14:S270-273, 1986.
 Wittmann DH. Prophylaxis of post-operative infections: single dose or multiple dosing?  Krankenhausarzt 59:515-534, 1986.
 Wittmann DH . Infection control and quality assurance in surgery.  Krankenhaus-Hygiene und Infektionsverhütung 8:66-74, 1986.
 Wittmann DH, Müller M. Patient stratification in intra-abdominal infektion. Chemiotherapia 6S:5-8, 1987.
 Wittmann DH, Teichmann W, Müller M. Development and validation of peritonitis indices Altona.   Langenbecks Arch Chir 372:834-835, 1987.
 Wittmann DH. Use and abuse of antibiotics worldwide: summary report from the WHO working group on prophylaxis of postoperative wound infections.  Infection 17:46-57, 1989.
 Wittmann DH, Bergstein JM, Aprahamian C. Etappenlavage for diffuse peritonitis.   Beitrag Anästhesie und Intensivmedizin 30:199-221, 1989.
 Nyström PO, Bax R, Dellinger EP, Dominioni L, Knaus WA, Meakins JL, Ohmann Ch, Solomkin JS,  Wacha H, Wittmann DH. A proposed standard for trials on intra-abdominal infection. World J Surg 14:148-156, 1990.
 Wittmann DH, Aprahamian C, Bergstein JM. Etappenlavage: Advanced diffuse peritonitis managed by planned multiple laparotomies utilizing zippers, slide fastener, and Velcro analogue for temporary abdominal closure.  World J Surg 14:218-226, 1990.
 Wittmann DH, Bergstein JM, Frantzides C. Calculated empirical antibiotic treatment of acute surgical infections. Infection 19:S345-350, 1991.
 Wittmann DH, Condon RE. Prophylaxis of postoperative infections. Infection, 19;S337-343, 1991.
 Condon RE, Wittmann DH:  The Use of Antibiotics in General Surgery. Mosby Year Book. Current Problems in Surgery 28:803-949, 1991.
 Frantzides CT, Lianos EA, Wittmann D, Greenwood B, Edmiston CE:  Prostaglandins  and modulation of small bowel myoelectric activity. Am J Physiol 262:G488-497, 1992.
 Wittmann DH, Aprahamian C, Bergstein JM, Edmiston CE, Frantzides CT, Quebbeman EJ, Condon RE:  A burr-like device to facilitate temporary abdominal closure in planned multiple laparotomies. Eur J Surg 159:75-79, 1993.
 Page CP, Bohnen JMA, Fletcher JR, McManus AT, Solomkin JS, Wittmann DH: Antimicrobial Prophylaxis for Surgical Wounds:  Guidelines for Clinical Care.  Arch Surg 128:79-88,1993.
 Schein M. Wittmann DH. Antibiotics in abdominal surgery: the less the better [Editorial] European Journal of Surgery. 159(9):451-3, 1993.
 Wittmann DH, Aprahamian C, Bergstein JM, Bansal N,  Wallace JR, Wittmann MM: Staged Abdominal Repair  Compares Favorably to Conventional Operative Therapy for Intra-abdominal Infections when Adjusting For prognostic Factors with a Logistic Model. Theoretical Surg (Now European J Surg)  25:273-284, 1994.
 Wittmann DH, Gores JA, Rangabashyam N, Sayek, I.  Laparostomy, Open Abdomen, Etappenlavage, Planned Relaparotomy and Staged Abdominal Repair: Too Many Names for a New Operative Method.  In Ruedi (Ed), State of the Art of Surgery, 1993/1994, International Society of Surgery, Reinach, Switzerland. pp. 23–27, 1994.
 Wittmann DH, Schein M, Condon RE:  Antibiotic Prophylaxis in Abdominal Wall Hernia Surgery:  Never, Always, or Selectively? Problems in General Surgery 12, 47-55, 1995.
 Holzheimer RG, Schein M, Wittmann DH: (335b) Inflammatory response in peritoneal exudate and plasma of patients undergoing planned relaparotomy for severe secondary peritonitis. Arch Surg 130;  1314-1320, 1995.
 Schein M, Wittmann DH, Aprahamian C, Condon RE:  The abdominal compartment syndrome:  The physiological and clinical consequences of elevated intra-abdominal pressure.  J Am Coll Surg 180:744-753, 1995.
 Wittmann DH, Schein M, Seoane D, Aprahamian C, Komorowski RA, Georgakas K, Quebbeman EJ, Wallace JR, Condon RE:  Pyoderma Fistulans Sinifica (Fox Den Disease):  A distinctive soft-tissue infection.  1995 Clin Infect Dis 21:162-170.
 Wittmann DH: Newer methods of operative therapy for peritonitis:  Open abdomen, planned relaparotomy or staged abdominal repair:  Is there a difference? (in Japanese including Commentary by Japanese author) Churchill Communications Osaka: Japan. Clinical Infection & Chemother  1:40-41, 1995.
 Wittmann DH, Schein M, Condon RE: Management of Secondary Peritonitis. Annals of Surgery  224;10-18, 1996.
 Wittmann MM, Wittmann AM, Wittmann DH;  AIDS, Emergency Operations, and Infection Control.  Infect  Control Hosp Epidemiology 17;532-538, 1996.
 Schein, M, Wittmann DH, Holzheimer, R, Condon, RE: Hypothesis: Compartmentalization of Cytokines in Intra-abdominal Infection. Surgery 119;694-700, 1996.
 Wittmann, DH: (348b) Pharmacokinetic basis for short courses of antimicrobial therapy. Eur J Surg, Suppl 576:19-23; 1996.
 Wittmann, DH, Schein, M: Let us shorten antibiotic prophylaxis and therapy in surgery. American Journal of Surgery. 172(6A):26S-32S, 1996.
 Schein M, Wittmann DH, Wittmann AM, Condon REC. Abdominal contamination, infection and Sepsis; a continuum. Br. J. Surg.  84;269-272, 1997.
 Slakey DP, Johnson CP, Cziperle DJ, Roza AM, Wittmann, DH, Gray DWR, Roake JA, Britton, J, Morris PJ, Adams MB:  Management of Severe Pancreatitis in Renal Transplant Recipients. Ann. Surg 225, 217-222, 1997.
 Wittmann DH. Scope and Limitations of Antimicrobial Therapy of Sepsis. Langenbecks Archive for Surgery. 383; 15-25.
 Wittmann, DH. Practice Management Guidelines For Prophylactic Antibiotics In Penetrating Abdominal Trauma East Guidelines  http://www.east.org/tpg/chap9body.html  http://www.east.org/tpg/atbpenetra.pdf
 Wittmann DH. Operative and Nonoperative Therapy of Intra-abdominal Infections. Infection 26:335-341, 1998.
 Wittmann DH, Antibiotic prophylaxis in biliary surgery. Chirurgische Gastroenterologie, 15:1-8, 1999.
 Luchette, FA, Borzotta, AP, Croce, MA, O’Neil, P, Wittmann, DH, Mullins, D and Palumbo, F: EAST Guideline: Practice Management Guidelines for Prophylactic Antibiotic Use in Penetrating Abdominal Trauma.  J Trauma 48;508-516, 2000.
 Wittmann DH, Iskander GA. The Abdominal Compartment Syndrome: Invited State-of-the-Art Paper. Journal of Intensive Care Medicine, 15; 201-220, 2000.
 Wittmann, DH. Staged abdominal Repair: Development and Current Practice of an Advanced Operative Technique for Diffuse Suppurative Peritonitis: European Surgery 32; 171-178, 2000.
 Nyström P-O, Wittmann D . Patient to surgeon infections - fact or fiction. Br J Surg. 2003 Nov; 90(11):1315-6.
 Wittmann, DH.  Letter to the Editor J Trauma. 2011;70: 273-277) Sew it Up! A Western Trauma Association Multi-Institutional Study of Enteric Injury Management in the Post injury Open Abdomen by WTA Study Group.J Trauma. 2012;71: 1840.
 Wittmann, DH. History of the Surgical Infections Society – Europe. Surg Infect 10(2013) p 1-11

External links 
 www.openabdomen.org
 www.colonna.net

1940 births
Living people
German surgeons
American surgeons
People from Milwaukee
University of California, San Francisco alumni
Physicians from Hamburg
Medical College of Wisconsin faculty
German emigrants to the United States
German expatriates in France
German expatriates in Algeria